John W. Blunt (May 18, 1840 – January 21, 1910) was a Union Army officer during the American Civil War. He received the Medal of Honor for gallantry during the Battle of Cedar Creek fought near Middletown, Virginia on October 19, 1864. The battle was the decisive engagement of Major General Philip Sheridan's Valley Campaigns of 1864 and was the largest battle fought in the Shenandoah Valley.

Blunt enlisted in the Army from Chatham, New York in October 1861, and was assigned to the 6th New York Cavalry. He was commissioned as an officer in November 1862. He transferred to the 2nd New York Provisional Cavalry in June 1865, and mustered out with this regiment in August.

Medal of Honor citation
The President of the United States of America, in the name of Congress, takes pleasure in presenting the Medal of Honor to First Lieutenant John W. Blunt, United States Army, for extraordinary heroism on 19 October 1864, while serving with Company K, 6th New York Cavalry, in action at Cedar Creek, Virginia. First Lieutenant Blunt voluntarily led a charge across a narrow bridge over the creek, against the lines of the enemy.

See also
List of American Civil War Medal of Honor recipients: A-F
List of Medal of Honor recipients for the Battle of Cedar Creek

References

External links

1840 births
1910 deaths
People from Chatham, New York
People of New York (state) in the American Civil War
Union Army officers
United States Army Medal of Honor recipients
American Civil War recipients of the Medal of Honor